Percy Beaumont (3 September 1897–1967) was an English footballer who played in the Football League for Barnsley, Sheffield United and Southend United.

References

1897 births
1967 deaths
English footballers
Association football forwards
English Football League players
Sheffield United F.C. players
Barnsley F.C. players
Southend United F.C. players
Mexborough Athletic F.C. players